The National Ski Center is a modern ski jumping complex with normal and large hill in Shchuchinsk, Kazakhstan. It's located in Burabay District in the northern part of the country.

History 
Works started in 2009 and officially opened  by Kazakh president Nursultan Nazarbayev in July 2018. The first official competition took place on 11 July 2019 on normal hill at the FIS Cup competition.

Longest jump on plastic ever

Invalid 
On 11 July 2018 at the opening event, Slovenian ski jumper Jurij Tepeš touched the ground at 154 metres (505 ft) long test jump, however, this is the longest summer jump ever in the history of plastic mate, on which they jump since 1955.

Summer world record 
On 11 July 2018 at the opening event, Kazakhstanian ski jumper Sergey Tkachenko set the summer world record distance at 151 metres (495 ft).

Competitions

Men

Ladies

See also 
Schuchinsk
Burabay District

References 

Sports venues in Kazakhstan
Skiing in Kazakhstan
Ski jumping venues
Sports venues completed in 2018